Patrick Elamenji Kanyuka (born 19 July 1987) is a ex Congolese footballer who played as a defender. Founder & owner of Waltham Cross Football Club, also a community organisation The Future Cross CIC.

Career

Queens Park Rangers
Born in Kinshasa, Kanyuka started his career with Leyton Orient as a youth player in 2003 before joining Queens Park Rangers the following year. Source Neilson N. Kaufman - historian Leyton Orient FC . Queens Park Rangers after signing a professional contract on 19 July 2004. His early career was plagued by injuries, but towards the end of the 2005–06 season he held down a regular place in John Gregory's side due to an injury to Danny Cullip.

Swindon Town
He signed for Swindon Town on 21 January 2008 until the end of the season after being released by Queens Park Rangers. Kanyuka made his Swindon debut in the 1–0 win at Luton Town, he played the whole game despite being kicked in the forehead by former QPR team mate Paul Furlong, an injury that required many stitches and forced him to miss Swindon's next game. He was released at the end of the season, having scored once against Bristol Rovers in 20 league appearances.

Motherwell trial & Northampton Town
On 21 July 2009, Scottish Premier League club Motherwell handed the defender a trial, however he later signed for League Two team Northampton Town on an initial three-month deal during October 2009 after a successful trial.

CFR Cluj & FC Unirea Alba Iulia loan
In January 2010 after impressing during pre-season Kanyuka was signed by CFR Cluj. He joined Unirea Alba Iulia on loan in August.

Lincoln City
On 27 January 2011, he signed on a free transfer for League Two side Lincoln City. In May 2011, he was not offered a new contract after a mass clear out of players following the club's relegation from the Football League.

Tamworth
In August 2011 he signed for Tamworth. Kanyuka was released from the club on 27 January 2012, having made 18 league and cup appearances, including a third round FA Cup match against Premier League side Everton.

Trials
On 13 March 2012 Kanyuka scored in a behind closed doors game at Leeds United's training ground, Thorp Arch, whilst on trial. Kanyuka went stateside and joined C.D. Chivas USA on trial. He left them on 28 March 2012.

Staines Town
In October 2012 he joined Staines Town. He move on to join Maidenhead United in December 2012 but left the following month to move to Thailand and join Roi Et United.

Limerick FC
In July 2015, Kanyuka joined Irish Premier Division side Limerick FC. He cemented his place in the first team with some impressive performances. He left the club following their relegation in November 2015.

Shan United FC
In 2016 January, Kanyuka moved to Shan United.

Coaching career
In 2021, Kanyuka was named the assistant manager to Anthony McNamee at Combined Counties League Division One side Enfield Borough.

In 2022, Waltham Cross Football Club was established by founder & Ex Professional footballer Patrick Kanyuka, They play in the Hertfordshire Senior County League division One. He currently is owner and manager of the club.

References

External links

1987 births
Living people
Footballers from Kinshasa
Democratic Republic of the Congo footballers
Association football defenders
Queens Park Rangers F.C. players
Swindon Town F.C. players
Northampton Town F.C. players
CFR Cluj players
CSM Unirea Alba Iulia players
Lincoln City F.C. players
Tamworth F.C. players
Staines Town F.C. players
Maidenhead United F.C. players
League of Ireland players
Limerick F.C. players
English Football League players
National League (English football) players
Liga I players
Expatriate footballers in England
Democratic Republic of the Congo expatriate footballers
Expatriate footballers in Romania
Democratic Republic of the Congo expatriate sportspeople in Romania
Expatriate footballers in Thailand
Expatriate association footballers in the Republic of Ireland
Black British sportspeople